Tommy Björkman (born 16 June 1934, dead 18 July 2022) was a Swedish ice hockey goaltender. Björkman was part of the Djurgården Swedish champions' team of 1958, 1959, 1960, 1961, 1962, and 1963.

References

Swedish ice hockey goaltenders
Djurgårdens IF Hockey players
1934 births
2022 deaths